Louise Fowler may refer to:

Louise Fowler (EastEnders)
Louise Fowler, character in Across the Continent